A list of notable British pornographic film actors:

Female

Male

See also
 Outline of British pornography
 Pornography in the United Kingdom

References

Pornographic
British